The Palm Jumeirah is an archipelago of artificial islands on the Persian Gulf in Jumeirah, Dubai, United Arab Emirates. It has an estimated population of at least 10,000 as of 2017.

The islands were created using land reclamation. The construction was done as a joint venture by two Dutch specialist companies, Van Oord and Boskalis. The same companies also created The World. The recently opened destinations The Pointe, Club Vista Mare and Nakheel Mall are the latest additions to Palm Jumeirah.

Transportation

The Palm Jumeirah Monorail,  monorail connecting the Atlantis Hotel to the Gateway Towers at the foot of the island. The monorail connects The Palm Jumeirah Dubai to the mainland, with a planned further extension to the Red Line of the Dubai Metro. The line began operating on 30 April 2009. It is the first monorail in the Middle East.

Wildlife
In the summer seasons, jellyfish frequent the beaches surrounding the Palm.  In early 2020, due to the reduction of human activity during the COVID-19 pandemic, an increase in wildlife, such as dolphins, around The Palm Jumeirah was observed.

Construction

Construction of The Palm Jumeirah Dubai island began in June 2001 and the developers announced handover of the first residential units in 2006.

At this time, 75% of the properties were ready to hand over, with 500 families already residing on the island. By the end of 2009, 28 hotels were opened on the Crescent.

The complexities of the construction were blamed, in part, for the extended delays to the completion of the project, the date of which was pushed back multiple times and was nearly two years late.

In response the developer, Nakheel Properties said they had received no reports of structural problems of a type that would be expected if there were any subsidence, and pointed out that the laser satellites had a measurement resolution of only .

Housing density
After launching the project, it was revealed that the developer increased the number of residential units on the island (with a concomitant reduction in the amount of physical space between individual properties) from the originally announced 4,500 (comprising 2,000 villas purchased early in the expectation of greater separation between properties). This increase was attributed to the developer miscalculating the actual cost of construction and requiring the raising of additional capital, although they had never commented publicly on the matter.  The New York Times reported in 2009 that many people had bought houses before they were built and are furious about the space available now and the way they seem to be living on top of each other.

Water quality

The outer breakwater was designed as a continuous barrier, but by preventing natural tidal movement, the seawater within the Palm became stagnant. The breakwater was subsequently modified to create gaps on either side, allowing tidal movement to oxygenate the water within and prevent it from stagnating, albeit less efficiently than would be the case if the breakwater did not exist.

Hotels and resorts
The Palm Jumeirah Dubai has a number of hotels, resorts, and hotel residences:

  Anantara The Palm Dubai Resort
  Atlantis, The Palm
 The Fairmont Palm Hotel & Resort
 St. Regis Dubai - The Palm
Emerald Palace Kempinski Dubai
 Kempinski Hotel & Residences
 Rixos The Palm Dubai
 Sofitel Dubai, The Palm Resort & Spa
 The Langham, Palm Jumeirah
 Jumeirah Zabeel Saray
 One & Only The Palm
 Taj Exotica Resort & Spa
 The Residences, Palm Jumeirah
 The Retreat Palm Dubai
 Waldorf Astoria Dubai Palm Jumeirah
 Kingdom Of Sheba, Palm Jumeirah
 The 8
 The Palm Resort & Spa
 FIVE Palm Jumeirah Dubai
 W Hotel
 Dukes Dubai
 ROYAL CENTRAL THE PALM
 C CENTRAL RESORT THE PALM
Retail and Dining Destinations:

 Nakheel Mall
 The Pointe
 Palm Views West and East
 The Boardwalk
 Al Ittihad Park
 Club Vista Mare
 Golden Mile Galleria

Environmental effects 
According to a study published in the journal Water in 2022, the construction of this island has had an effect on increasing water-soluble materials, changing the spectral profile of water and also increasing the temperature of the water surface around the island.

See also
 Palm Islands
 The World (archipelago)
 The Universe (Dubai)
 Tourism in Dubai
 Palm Grandeur
 Jumeirah Islands
 The Taj Exotica Hotel & Resort
 Longshore drift

References

External links

The Palm Islands Multimedia website

Artificial islands of Dubai
Populated coastal places in the United Arab Emirates
Peninsulas of the United Arab Emirates
Nakheel Properties
 
2001 establishments in the United Arab Emirates